The Abukuma Kōgen Road (あぶくま高原道路 Abukuma Kōgen Dōro) is a two-lane toll road in Fukushima Prefecture. It serves as an alternate route between the Tōhoku Expressway and Ban-etsu Expressway through south-central the plains of Fukushima Prefecture. It was also built to serve as a bypass of a proposed location for a new capital of Japan in the aforementioned flat area. The road is managed by the Fukushima Prefecture Road Corporation and is numbered E80 under the Ministry of Land, Infrastructure, Transport and Tourism's "2016 Proposal for Realization of Expressway Numbering."

Junction list
The entire expressway is in Fukushima Prefecture.
PA=Parking area, TB=Toll booth

See also

References

External links

 Abukuma Kōgen Road Management Office

Roads in Fukushima Prefecture
Toll roads in Japan
Regional High-Standard Highways in Japan
2001 establishments in Japan